Gabu or Gabú may refer to:

 Gabu Region of  Guinea-Bissau
 Gabu, a town and capital of Gabu Region, Guinea-Bissau
 Gabu, Nigeria
 Gat Andrés Bonifacio University, a university in the Philippines